The South Adelbert or Southern Adelbert Range languages are a family of languages in the Madang stock of New Guinea, spoken along the tributaries of the Ramu River in the watershed of the Adelbert Range.

Languages
The languages are as follows.
 Tomul River (~ Josephstaal)
Osum (Utarmbung)
Wadaginam
Pomoikan: Anam (Pondoma), Anamgura (Ikundun) – Moresada
 Sogeram River (~ Wanang) (see)

In earlier classifications, such as that of Wurm, the Tomul River languages plus the Sikan languages were called "Josephstaal", while the rest of the Sogeram family was called "Wanang".

References

Further reading
Ross, Malcolm. 2014. Proto-South-Adelbert. TransNewGuinea.org.
Z'graggen, J.A. A comparative word list of the Southern Adelbert Range languages, Madang Province, Papua New Guinea. D-33, xvi + 113 pages. Pacific Linguistics, The Australian National University, 1980. 

 
Languages of Papua New Guinea
West Madang languages